Ricky Barnor (born 23 September 1943) is a Ghanaian boxer. He competed in the men's light middleweight event at the 1972 Summer Olympics. At the 1972 Summer Olympics, he lost in his first fight to Rolando Garbey of Cuba.

References

1943 births
Living people
Ghanaian male boxers
Olympic boxers of Ghana
Boxers at the 1972 Summer Olympics
Place of birth missing (living people)
Light-middleweight boxers